The 2017–18 season is Cambridge United's 106th season in their history, their 39th in the Football League, and their fourth consecutive season in League Two. Along with League Two, the club will also participate in the FA Cup, EFL Cup and EFL Trophy.

The season covers the period from 1 July 2017 to 30 June 2018.

Squad

Squad details at start of season

Source: Soccerbase

Transfers in

Transfers out

Loans in

Loans out

Squad statistics this season

As of match played 3 March 2018

Suspensions

Competitions

Pre-season matches

As of 7 June 2017, Cambridge United have announced ten pre-season friendlies against Norwich City (two one hour matches), Southend United, Tottenham Hotspur U23, St Neots Town, St Albans City, Royston Town, Ebbsfleet United, Dartford and Hemel Hempstead Town.

League Two

League table

Results summary

Results by matchday

Matches
On 21 June 2017, the fixtures for the forthcoming season were announced.

FA Cup

On 16 October 2017, Cambridge United were drawn at home to Sutton United in the first round. An away trip to Newport County was confirmed for the second round.

EFL Cup

On 16 June 2017, Cambridge United were drawn away to Bristol Rovers in the first round.

EFL Trophy

On 12 July 2017, Cambridge United were drawn in Southern Section Group H along with Northampton Town, Peterborough United and Southampton U23s.

References

Cambridge United F.C. seasons
Cambridge United